Robert Black (born March 27, 1962) is a Canadian Senator from Ontario. He was named to the Senate by Prime Minister Justin Trudeau on February 15, 2018. Prior to his appointment, Black was a leader in the agricultural community. He has been chief executive of the Rural Ontario Institute since 2010 and has also been involved in the 4-H farm youth organization since the 1970s. He subsequently joined the Independent Senators Group and, on November 4, 2019, he joined the Canadian Senators Group.

Black has also been a councillor on the Wellington County council from 2014 until his appointment to the Senate and was a civil servant with the Ontario Ministry of Agriculture for fifteen years. He has also served on the Ontario Agricultural Hall of Fame's board of directors.

Early life and education
Black was born and raised in Fergus, Ontario. In 1981 he graduated from Centre Wellington District High School. He attended the University of Guelph in the Bachelor of Science in Agriculture program, graduating in 1985, and subsequently earned his Bachelor of Education from Queen's University in Kingston, graduating in 1990.

References

1962 births
Living people
21st-century Canadian politicians
Independent Canadian senators
Ontario municipal councillors
Canadian Senators Group
Canadian senators from Ontario